Assouline is a surname. Notable people with the surname include: 

David Assouline (born 1959), French politician
Pierre Assouline (born 1953), French writer and journalist
Ron Assouline (born 1957), Israeli film director

Jewish surnames